Tante care cose (an Italian greeting for 'best wishes') is the second studio album by Italian singer-songwriter Fulminacci. The album was released on 12 March 2021 and includes the singles "Canguro", "Un fatto tuo personale" and the 2021 Sanremo Music Festival entry "Santa Marinella".

Track listing

Charts

Certifications

References

2021 albums
Fulminacci albums